Clyde Bridge, not to be confused with the similarly named Clyde's Bridge further upstream, is a road bridge built in 1932 spanning the River Clyde between Motherwell and Hamilton in Scotland. The bridge carries the A723 between the towns and also serves as access to a major interchange (Junction 6) of the M74 motorway. It replaced the earlier Hamilton Bridge nearby which had a different angle of crossing.

In 1953 a triumphal arch made of steel lattice grid manufactured by the local Motherwell Bridge Engineering Works was erected above the bridge on the Motherwell side to commemorate the Coronation of Elizabeth II. It was removed in 1969. In 2011, South Lanarkshire Council undertook a £38,000 renovation of the steel girder bridge to strengthen the underwater supports, following Government advice after several bridges were washed away in flooding.

References 

Bridges across the River Clyde
Road bridges in Scotland
Bridges completed in 1932
Buildings and structures in Hamilton, South Lanarkshire
Buildings and structures in Motherwell
Transport in North Lanarkshire
1932 establishments in Scotland
Transport in South Lanarkshire